Black Banks may refer to:

Black Banks, Prince Edward Island, a community
Black Banks Creek, a stream in South Dakota